K3 Dierenhotel is a Flemish comedy film from 2014, directed by Bart Van Leemputten and based on the comedyseries Hallo K3
It is the fifth K3-film and the second one with Josje Huisman. This is also the last film with former members of K3.

Plot
Kristel has plans to stay at a beauty farm for the weekend. Karen and Josje are helping Bas at an kennel/animal hotel, but Kristel doesn't know this. Because of a GPS mix-up, the girls arrive at the wrong place. Karen knows this, but Josje doesn't. So Karen wants her to think the beauty farm is a kennel. When they find out the kennel may be torn down the girls come together to save it.

Cast
Karen Damen as herself
Josje Huisman as herself
Kristel Verbeke as herself
Albert Verlinde as Mr. Francois
Philippe Geubels as Danny
Metta Gramberg as Rosie 
Winston Post as Bas 
Jacques Vermeire as Marcel
Dries van Hegen as Mr. de Vries
Serge-Henri Valcke as Eric-Jan
Maarten Bosmans as Man
Daisy Thys as Mrs. Lama

External links 
 

Belgian comedy films